Captive or Captives may refer to:

Arts, entertainment, and media

Films
 Captive (1980 film), a sci-fi film, starring Cameron Mitchell and David Ladd
 Captive (1986 film), a British-French film starring Oliver Reed
 Captive (1991 film), a television film starring Joanna Kerns and Barry Bostwick
 Captive (1998 film), a film starring Erika Eleniak and Michael Ironside
 Captive (2003 film), an Argentine film starring Bárbara Lombardo
 Captive (2008 film), a Russian-Belgian film
 Captive (2012 film), a Filipino-French film directed by Brillante Mendoza, starring Isabelle Huppert
 Captive (2015 film), an American thriller film starring Kate Mara and David Oyelowo
 Captive (2021 film), a Canadian documentary film
 Captives, a 1994 British romantic crime drama film

Television
 Captive (2004 TV series), a 2004 New Zealand show
 Captive (2016 TV series), a 2016 Netflix documentary series
 Captive (Fear the Walking Dead), an episode of the television series Fear the Walking Dead

Other uses in arts, entertainment, and media
 Captive (soundtrack), an album by The Edge, guitarist of U2
 Captive (video game), a 1990 computer role-playing game
 Captive!, a novel in World of Adventure series by Gary Paulsen

Business
 Captive insurance, insurance companies established with the specific objective of financing risks emanating from their parent group
 Captive service, a type of business process outsourcing where an organization will use a wholly owned subsidiary instead of a third party vendor

Computing and technology
 Captive NTFS, an open-source project
 Captive portal, a technique that forces an HTTP client on a network to see a special web page

See also
 Captivity (disambiguation)
 The Captive (disambiguation)